Tricholoma terreum, commonly known as the grey knight or dirty tricholoma, is a grey-capped mushroom of the large genus Tricholoma. It is found in coniferous woodlands in Europe, and has also been encountered under introduced pine trees in Australia.  It is regarded as edible. A 2014 article speculated that it may be poisonous,
but Sitta et al. in 2016 published in the same journal a counter article demonstrating the unfounded nature of such speculation.

Taxonomy
The fungus was originally described as Agaricus terreus by Jacob Christian Schäffer in 1762, and as Agaricus myomyces by mycologist Christian Hendrik Persoon in 1794. It was given its current binomial name by German Paul Kummer in 1871. It is commonly known as the grey knight from its discoloured gills.

Almost all modern sources consider Tricholoma myomyces to be a synonym of T. terreum, but there are some exceptions.  Bon mentions that T. myomyces has been defined for lowland mushrooms with white gills and a fleecy cap and Courtecuisse separates it on the same basis.   Moser distinguished T. myomyces on the basis that the gills should go yellow.

Description
Convex with a slight boss, it is broadly conical in shape. There is no ring or volva. The whitish  flesh is thin, easily broken, and has a pleasant mild (not mealy) smell and taste. The widely spaced and uneven gills are free (unattached to the stipe). The spore print is white, the oval spores 6–7 μm long by 3.5–4.4 μm wide.

It could be confused with the larger (and poisonous) T. pardinum has a mealy smell and cap scales; the edible T. orirubens has fine dark scales and pinkish gills.

Distribution and habitat
Tricholoma terreum is found in Europe, where fruiting bodies appear under conifers, particularly pine and spruce, from late summer to late autumn. They may also arise in parks near these trees, and grow in fairy rings. They are generally in quite densely populated groups though not bunched. It has been recorded growing under exotic Pinus radiata plantations in Australia.

Edibility
With a mild taste, the species used to be regarded as a good edible. It is seen in markets in France, along with Clitocybe nebularis and Tricholoma portentosum. However, some authorities recommend that inexperienced pickers avoid all grey tricholomas.  
Recent chemical tests show that this species may contain toxins which can cause rhabdomyolysis. However, from more recent investigations it has emerged that only an abnormal quantity of Tricholoma mushrooms may trigger the rhabdomyolysis and normal consumption of about 200g of mushroom is safe unless there is an individual reaction.

See also
List of North American Tricholoma
List of Tricholoma species

References

terreum
Edible fungi
Fungi described in 1774
Fungi found in fairy rings
Fungi of Europe
Taxa named by Jacob Christian Schäffer